The Tia Maria mine is a large copper deposit located in the south of Peru in the province of Islay, Arequipa Region. The deposit contains an estimated total reserves 711 million tonnes of ore graded at 0.36% copper. The project is operated by Southern Peru Copper Corporation.

In 2011, there were protests against the project which led to the deaths of three people. Concerns about the impact on agriculture led to the project's being put on hold.

A revised Environmental Impact Assessment by Geoservice Ingeniería for Southern Copper Corporation was approved in August 2014. The construction permit is still pending.

A new round of protests began in March 2015, including a march of eight hundred people. Many people were injured, and, by May, three more people have died from protesting.

See also 
 Mining in Peru  
 List of mines in Peru  
 Zinc mining

References 

Copper mines in Peru